Sarah Bahbah is an Australian artist of Palestinian and Jordanian descent. She studied creative advertising at university, then started photographing music festivals, including Firefly, after her first year.

Bahbah first came to international attention with her breakout photo series, "Sex and Takeout," a play on food porn and indulging without restraint.

Elite Daily and Nylon named her Best Instagrammer in 2016. That same year, Bahbah's collaboration with Butter, a fried chicken restaurant in Sydney, drew criticism for its display of Bahbah's images of nude women throughout the dining area and on the restaurant's website.  She held her first solo exhibition, Fuck Me, Fuck You, in New York City in 2018. The solo exhibition Splash followed in London.

VICE has described Bahbah's photos as "optimized for the Internet". Bahbah often captions her images using subtitles, with the resulting image resembling a film still. In 2018 Selena Gomez was accused of copying Bahbah's visual style without credit in her music video "Back to You". Bahbah's official response claimed that she was "flattered that so many have referenced me in Selena's latest work". In July 2020, Bahbah directed the music video for Kygo's remix of the song "What's Love Got to Do with It" starring Laura Harrier

Style and influences 
Bahbah's instantly recognizable images, which employ the use of subtitles, have made her a "go-to" in the industry for this style of work. In interviews early in her artistic career, Bahbah describes the inspiration behind her series "Summer Without A Pool", a style continued throughout her future body of work:It's been on my mind to use Instagram in a new way for sometime. I kept asking myself, what makes me stop and think, "Yes, this," when I'm cruising the platform. I quickly became obsessed with screen shots of foreign films that have subtitles overlaying. I loved the notion of having a strong image, complemented by strong copy. I wanted to take it to the next level and create a serial, episodic quasi-narrative. Each individual piece tells a story on its own, but when you bring the body of work together, there is a deeper narrative open to interpretation, leaving viewers to draw their own conclusions based on their own experiences.

Symbolism 
Bahbah's series "I Could Not Protect Her" is a multimedia work challenging the artist's trauma from childhood sexual abuse. The photo portion of the series presents the conflicting sentiments felt by the subject; subtitles convey a simultaneous desire for approval from the abuser and a strong detest for his actions. In the closing piece of this series, " I Could Not Protect Her--The Poem", a silent-subtitled video of a woman details her journey through abuse and the continuation of unchecked actions by the abuser upon her niece; "I could not protect her, Because I could not protect myself."

In an interview following the launch of this series with Teen Vogue, Bahbah speaks about how being silenced as a child informs her current work:As a child, I was constantly dismissed. The disregard for my existence raised me into an apathetic adult- completely disassociated from my emotions. It was only until my trauma resurfaced that I understood that my work had become a projection of my childhood. Through my art I had begun to manifest freedom. My sole intent in my work and my being is to practice transparency of my emotions, and to express, express, express, as for so long I didn't have a voice. Through my art I'm creating a safe space for expression for myself, and in doing so, I hope to empower others to do the same.

References

External links 

 
 Interview by Anas Bukhash

Living people
Australian women photographers
Year of birth missing (living people)